Yevgeni Vladislavovich Osipov (born 29 October 1986) is a Russian professional football player who plays for Shinnik Yaroslavl.

Career

Club
On 16 January 2020, FC Urartu announced the signing of Osipov.

References

External links
 
 

1986 births
People from Temryuksky District
Sportspeople from Krasnodar Krai
Living people
Russian footballers
Association football defenders
FC Orenburg players
FC Zhemchuzhina Sochi players
FC Mordovia Saransk players
FC Ufa players
FC Arsenal Tula players
FK Riteriai players
FCI Levadia Tallinn players
FC Urartu players
FC Shinnik Yaroslavl players
Russian Premier League players
Russian First League players
Russian Second League players
A Lyga players
Meistriliiga players
Armenian Premier League players
Russian expatriate footballers
Expatriate footballers in Lithuania
Russian expatriate sportspeople in Lithuania
Expatriate footballers in Estonia
Russian expatriate sportspeople in Estonia
Expatriate footballers in Armenia
Russian expatriate sportspeople in Armenia